Vĩnh Lộc A is a rural commune (xã) of Hồng Dân District in Bạc Liêu Province, Vietnam.

References

Communes of Bạc Liêu province
Populated places in Bạc Liêu province